Murray Edmund Watts,  (1909 – October 8, 1982) was a Canadian mining engineer and prospector. He is known for a series of important ore discoveries in the Arctic regions, beginning at the age of 22, and continuing through a long career.

Biography
Watts was born in the silver town of Cobalt, Ontario in 1909.

Mineral discoveries 
He is credited with the following mineral discoveries:
 Raglan nickel deposits, Cape Smith belt, Ungava region (now Nunavik) of Quebec, Canadaa discovery made at the age of 22
 Asbestos Hill asbestos deposits, Ungava region of Quebec, Canada (once operated by Asbestos Corporation Limited)
 Mary River iron deposits, Baffin Island, Canada
 "47"-zone copper deposit, Coppermine River area, Northwest Territories, Canada

Career 
He was also known as a manager for mining companies. He was mine superintendent of Canadian Malartic Gold Mines and  general manager of Little Long Lac Gold Mines  (1948–56). In 1962, he founded the international geological and mining consulting firm, Watts, Griffis and McOuat Limited with co-founders Arthur Thomas Griffis and Jack McOuat.

Awards 
 Canadian Mining Hall of Fame Inductee (1989)
 Order of Canada
 Massey Medal of the Canadian Geographical Society.

References

Canadian prospectors
1909 births
1982 deaths
Canadian mining engineers
Members of the Order of Canada
Massey Medal recipients
Canadian mining businesspeople